Pedro Juan Febles González  (18 April 1958 – 14 December 2011) was a Venezuelan football player and manager.

Club career
Febles played for Deportivo Galicia, Atlético San Cristóbal and C.S. Marítimo de Venezuela.

International career
Febles made 25 appearances for the senior Venezuela national football team from 1979 to 1989, including participation in the 1979 Copa América, 1983 Copa América and 1989 Copa América.

He also competed for Venezuela at the 1980 Summer Olympics in Moscow, Soviet Union, where the team was eliminated after the preliminary round.

Manager
Febles was a successful coach for Caracas FC winning the league during the 87-88 season. He also coached Deportivo Italia and the Venezuela National Team under-14 with Augusto Visa as an assistant coach. Many of his player from that National Team went on to play professional in the Venezuelan League, some of them such as: Alejandro Iglesias, Arnold Rivera, Pablo Rosas, Edwin Quilaguri, Pedro Millan and German Yumar.

Personal
Febles died at age 52 on 14 December 2011.

References

1958 births
2011 deaths
Footballers from Caracas
Venezuelan footballers
Venezuela international footballers
Footballers at the 1980 Summer Olympics
Olympic footballers of Venezuela
1979 Copa América players
1983 Copa América players
1989 Copa América players
Deportivo Italia players
C.S. Marítimo de Venezuela players
Venezuelan football managers
Caracas FC managers
Deportivo Italia managers
Association football forwards
Mineros de Guayana managers
Deportivo La Guaira managers
Deportivo Miranda F.C. managers